Capital punishment is a legal penalty in the U.S. state of Mississippi.

Legal process 
When the prosecution seeks the death penalty, the sentence is decided by the jury and must be unanimous. If the jury recommends death, it is required to record what it considers the "aggravating circumstances" about the crime that led it to that decision.

In case of a hung jury during the penalty phase of the trial, the judge issues a life sentence, even if only one juror opposed death (there is no retrial).

The power of clemency belongs to the Governor of Mississippi.

Capital crimes 

The following crimes are punishable by death in Mississippi:

Treason. 
Murder with one of the following aggravating factors:
It was committed by a person under sentence of imprisonment.
The defendant was previously convicted of another capital offense or of a felony involving the use or threat of violence to the person.
The defendant knowingly created a great risk of death to many persons.
It was committed while the defendant was engaged, or was an accomplice, in the commission of, or an attempt to commit, or flight after committing or attempting to commit, any robbery, rape, arson, burglary, kidnapping, aircraft piracy, sexual battery, unnatural intercourse with any child under the age of 12, or nonconsensual unnatural intercourse with mankind, or felonious abuse or battery of a child, or the unlawful use or detonation of a bomb or explosive device.
It was committed for the purpose of avoiding or preventing a lawful arrest or effecting an escape from custody.
It was committed for pecuniary gain.
It was committed to disrupt or hinder the lawful exercise of any governmental function or the enforcement of laws.
It was committed to influence the policy of a governmental entity by intimidation or coercion, or to affect the conduct of a governmental entity by mass destruction or assassination.
It was especially heinous, atrocious or cruel.
It was committed to intimidate or coerce a civilian population.

The laws on the books in Mississippi also provide the death penalty for aircraft hijacking under Title 97, Chapter 25, Section 55 of the Mississippi Code, but in 2008, the U.S. Supreme Court ruled in Kennedy v. Louisiana, that the death penalty is unconstitutional when applied to non-homicidal crimes against the person. However, the ruling meant that crimes "against the state" such as treason or terrorism would not likely be unconstitutional. Therefore, the offence of aircraft hijacking would likely be considered a crime against the state in Mississippi because it is widely considered to be an act of terrorism and the death penalty in this case may be constitutional.

Death row and executions 
Men on death row are held at Unit 29 in The Mississippi State Penitentiary, while women on death row are held at the Central Mississippi Correctional Facility (CMCF) in Rankin County, Mississippi.

The method of execution is lethal injection. Executions take place in the execution chamber, built in 2002, adjacent to the gas chamber, which is no longer in use, but continues to sit there to this day.

Currently executions occur at the Mississippi Department of Corrections (MDOC) Mississippi State Penitentiary (MSP, also known as "Parchman") in Sunflower County, Mississippi. The condemned prisoner is moved into a holding cell adjacent to the execution room in Unit 17, the location of the execution chamber, in the MSP from his or her death row unit 48 hours prior to the execution. The state places MSP on emergency lockdown status 24 hours before the execution. At 12:00 PM a media center at MSP opens. At 3:00 PM the condemned's attorney of record and chaplain are permitted to visit him or her. At 4:00 PM the prisoner receive his or her last meal; he or she may shower at that time. At 4:30 PM, if the condemned desires, MDOC clergy may visit him or her. At 5:30 witnesses to the execution are transported to Unit 17. At 6:00 PM officials move the condemned from the holding cell to the execution chamber. At the same time the witnesses enter the designated observation areas and the execution by lethal injection is then carried out thereafter. At 7:00 PM the state conducts a post-execution briefing with media witnesses. At 8:30 PM the state closes its media center.

Early history
The State of Mississippi used hanging as its method of execution for much of its history. From the earliest recorded execution in 1818 to 2004, records indicate that the state executed a total of 794 people. Of these, the great majority were black males, who account for 639 of recorded executions.

Around the time of the 1901 opening of the Mississippi State Penitentiary (MSP) in Parchman, Sunflower County residents objected to having executions performed at MSP because they feared that Sunflower County would be stigmatized as a "death county." Therefore, the State of Mississippi originally performed executions of condemned criminals in their counties of conviction. When, in 1940, Mississippi's state legislature decided to change the state's method of execution to electrocution, while continuing to conduct executions in the county of conviction, a portable electric chair was developed and fabricated for the state's use. On October 11, 1940, the state's first execution of a condemned prisoner by electrocution occurred; Willie Mae Bragg, a black man convicted of murdering his wife, was electrocuted in his county of conviction, Jefferson Davis County. Interestingly, on the same day, Mississippi also carried out their final hanging in a different county when Hilton Fortenberry, another murderer, was put to death in Sharkey County. The state moved the electric chair from county to county, using it to kill condemned prisoners in their counties of conviction. One such example was Houston Roberts, a white man convicted of poisoning his granddaughter in Jackson. Mississippi and Louisiana were the only U.S. states to use a portable electric chair.

Around the 1950s residents of Sunflower County were still opposed to the concept of housing the execution chamber at MSP. In September 1954, Governor Hugh L. White called for a special session of the Mississippi Legislature to discuss the application of the death penalty. During that year, a gas chamber serving as an execution chamber was installed at MSP. The gas chamber replaced the portable electric chair which, between 1940 and November 10, 1954, had been moved from county to county to execute condemned prisoners. The final execution in a portable electric chair was that of James Johnson, a white man convicted of murder, was executed in the Simpson County courthouse, where, as was customary in Mississippi at the time, the executioner placed the chair in the same courtroom where the jury had convicted the condemned man. The first person to die in the gas chamber was Gerald A. Gallego, who was executed on March 3, 1955.

Since 1976 resumption of capital punishment nationwide

On July 1, 1984 the Legislature of Mississippi amended §§ 99-19-51 of the Mississippi Code; the new amendment stated that prisoners who committed capital crimes after July 1, 1984 would be executed by lethal injection. When the Central Mississippi Correctional Facility (CMCF) opened in January 1986, all women who were incarcerated at MSP were moved to CMCF. The $41 million Unit 32, the state's designated location for male death row inmates, opened in August 1990. Previously Unit 17 housed MSP's male death row. On March 18, 1998 the legislature made another amendment, removing the gas chamber as a method of execution. The lethal injection table was first used in 2002.

Since 1976, Mississippi has executed fewer prisoners than six other southern states despite comparable homicide rates. As of November 2021, 22 inmates were executed after 1976. One critic claims that this stems from the inability of poorer counties to afford legal fees for defendants accused of capital crimes. Because death penalty cases are subject to a high standard of review—and there is a constitutional requirement for effective assistance of counsel as a matter of Due process of law and subsequent appellate review—this has led to a practical and constitutional impediment to its operation.

Since 1985, six prisoners on death row in Mississippi have been released after their charges were dismissed or they were acquitted of the charges on appeal.

Further reading
 Cabana, Donald A. "The History of Capital Punishment in Mississippi: An Overview." (Archive) HistoryNow, Mississippi Historical Society. Hosted at the Mississippi Department of Archives & History.

See also

List of people executed in Mississippi
List of death row inmates in Mississippi
Crime in Mississippi
Law of Mississippi

References

External links
 Death Row - Mississippi Department of Corrections
 Death Row - Mississippi Department of Corrections (Archive)

 
Mississippi
Mississippi law